A secret speech was allegedly given by Joseph Stalin, on 19 August 1939, to members of the Politburo, wherein he justified the Soviet strategy to promote military conflict in Europe, which would be beneficial for the future territorial expansion of the Communist system. The strategy included Soviet-Nazi collaboration and the Molotov–Ribbentrop Pact. 

The historicity of the speech is still the subject of academic debate. Plausible textual evidence of this speech found in various reputable archives has been academically studied and published, however no formal first-hand evidence of a Politburo meeting held on 19 August 1939 or the delivery of the quoted speech has yet been proven. The Russian version of the speech can be found at the Centre for Historic Documents of the former Special Archives of the USSR. Speeches given in secret were common at the time, the Politburo being a closed and secretive body.

Summary of documents 
In the source material available to historians, Stalin is represented as expressing an expectation that the war would be the best opportunity to weaken both the capitalistic Western states and Nazi Germany, and make Germany suitable for "Sovietization". There is also expectation of eventual territorial expansion to the Baltic countries, Finland and Poland, with the approval of either the Western powers or Germany. Historians who have studied those documents have suggested that the speech formed the basis of the Molotov–Ribbentrop Pact, which was signed just four days later on 23 August 1939.

Source material and timeline 
The first version of this speech was published partially on 28 November 1939, in the Paris newspaper Le Temps by the news agency Havas despatch from Geneva. Since then several versions, varying in content, have been in circulation.

In 1994, the Russian publicist Tatiana S. Bushuyeva published an archival reference of the speech in an article printed in the Novy Mir magazine (#12, 1994) based on what she claimed was recent findings in Soviet Special Archives of a text, which according to her was supposedly recorded by a Comintern member present at the meeting.

Historicity and debate 
Whether this speech was ever given by Stalin is still the subject of dispute by historians. According to Viktor Suvorov's book M-Day, Soviet historians laid special emphasis on claiming that no Politburo meeting took place on 19 August 1939, but the Russian military historian Dmitri Volkogonov has found the evidence that a meeting really took place on that day, but the question of an attack on Germany was not discussed, the military plan was not mentioned on the agenda of the meeting. The agenda of the meeting, according to Volkogonov, discussed the issue of deferment from the draft of workers of one of the railways. 

The speech took place according to research book Stalin's Missed Chance by the military historian Mikhail Meltyukhov, which covers the alleged offensive plans by Stalin. However, the third edition of the book, in 2008, omits any mention of 1939 speech.

Sergey Sluch and Carl Nordling also reviewed the history of the subject.

References

Citations

Bibliography 

Revue de Droit International, de Sciences Diplomatiques et Politiques (The International Law Review), 1939, Nr. 3, Juillet-Septembre. P. 247-249.
Otechestvennaya Istoriya  Отечественная история, 2004, No. 1, pp. 113–139.
A.L.Weeks Stalin's Other War: Soviet Grand Strategy, 1939–1941

External links 
Stalin's speech to the Politburo on 19 August 1939, reconstructed from renderings in Novyi Mir, Moscow, and Revue de Droit International, Geneva, pieced together by Carl O. Nordling, Sweden
 Tatjana Bushuyeva’s article in Novyy Mir
 Irina Pavlova about documents related to beginning of World War II
 Irina Pavlova about findings by Bushueva

1939 in the Soviet Union
Documents of the Soviet Union
Foreign relations of the Soviet Union
World War II speeches
Forgery controversies
Joseph Stalin
Works by Joseph Stalin
August 1939 events
1939 speeches